Nisaga rufescens is a moth in the family Eupterotidae. It was described by George Hampson in 1895. It is found in India.

References

Moths described in 1895
Eupterotinae